Mailu, or Magi (Magɨ), is a Papuan language of Papua New Guinea.

Overview
Magi is a non-Austronesian language spoken by upwards of 6000 people living on the islands of Mailu, Laluoru, Loupomu and Eunuoro and along the south coast between Cape Rodney and mid-Orangerie Bay of the Central Province of Papua New Guinea. It is often referred to as 'Mailu' as one of the major villages speaking this language is the village of that name on Mailu Island. It is related to the other languages of the Mailuan family (Ma, Laua, Morawa, Neme'a, Domu and Bauwaki whose speakers live or lived inland of this area).  Ma and Laua are now extinct.

Magi speakers have for a long time had close contacts and (probably extensive) integration with Austronesian speakers, with the result that there has been a significant adoption of Austronesian vocabulary (around 30–40%, particularly Magori, Gadaisu, Suau, Ouma, Yoba and Bina, of which the last three are now extinct).

In turn, Magori (as well as Yoba, Bina, and Ouma) has received significant influence from Magi.

Magi itself is divided into two main groups of dialects: the eastern (Maisi/Varo) dialects, and the western (Island) dialects.

See also
Magori language, a nearby mixed Austronesian-Papuan language

Notes

References

Thomson, N P, 1975, "Magi Phonology and Grammar: Fifty Years Afterwards", in T E Dutton, Ed., "Studies in Languages of Central and South-East Papua, Pub. by The Australian National University, Pacific Linguistics, Series C, No 29.
Thomson, N P,  1975, "The Dialects of Magi", in "Papers in New Guinea Linguistics No 18", Pub. by The Australian National University, Pacific Linguistics, Series A No 40.

External links 
 Mailu Swadesh List by The Rosetta Project at the Internet Archive

Languages of Central Province (Papua New Guinea)
Mailuan languages